John James Jaffray Mallard (18 December 1860 – 26 March 1935) was a New Zealand cricketer and insurance executive. He played two first-class matches for Otago between 1882 and 1885.

Mallard was born in Melbourne and moved with his family to Dunedin in 1864. After attending Otago Boys' High School he began working for the Victoria Insurance Company. He joined the National Insurance Company of New Zealand in 1888 and remained with the company until he retired in 1926. He was secretary of the company from 1914 to 1919, and general manager from 1919 until his retirement. He was an authority on the history of Dunedin and the Otago region, and had been president of the Otago Early Settlers' Association for five years at the time of his death in 1935.

See also
 List of Otago representative cricketers

References

External links
 

1860 births
1935 deaths
People educated at Otago Boys' High School
New Zealand cricketers
Australian emigrants to New Zealand
Otago cricketers
Cricketers from Melbourne
Businesspeople in insurance